Tralles is an irregular lunar impact crater that is attached to the northwestern rim of the much larger crater Cleomedes, in the northeastern part of the Moon. Within one crater diameter to the northwest is Debes. The crater is named after the German mathematician and physicist Johann Georg Tralles.

This is an oddly shaped crater formation with an irregular perimeter. The rugged interior has the appearance of three overlapping craters, with one at the south end, a second to the northeast and a third to the northwest. There are also several tiny craterlets located within the jumbled inner surface.

Satellite craters

By convention these features are identified on lunar maps by placing the letter on the side of the crater midpoint that is closest to Tralles.

References

 
 
 
 
 
 
 
 
 
 
 

Impact craters on the Moon